The Gerontology Research Group (GRG) based in Los Angeles, California, USA, is a global social science organization of researchers in various fields of gerontology, primarily concerned with verifying and recording supercentenarians (people who are at least 110 years old). 

The group endeavors to further gerontology research with a goal of slowing and reversing aging.

History

The GRG was founded in 1990 by L. Stephen Coles and Stephen M. Kaye. The original chapter the LA-GRG, holds meetings each month though the organization has members worldwide who meet via online forums.

The GRG verifies supercentenarians (people at least 110 years old or elder) by validating proof-of-age documents. People that have attained supercentenarian status, are required to supply the organization documents that prove the persons birth date, change of name (if applicable), and date of death (if applicable), along with another piece of official government identification. Researchers from the GRG then verify that these documents are true and correct and if they are, the claimant is included in the GRG's official tables of supercentenarians.

The GRG also conducts research on aging by interviewing supercentenarians and collecting blood and DNA samples.

To 2015, the Gerontology Research Group found proofs of supercentenarian age for more than 1700 persons.

See also

 Longevity
 New England Centenarian Study

References

External links
 
  at the site of GRG

Gerontology organizations
Medical and health organizations based in California
Scientific organizations established in 1990
Research institutes established in 1990
Research groups